Dondre A. Gilliam (born February 9, 1977) is a former American football wide receiver who played two seasons with the San Diego Chargers of the National Football League (NFL). He has also been a member of the Scottish Claymores and Hamilton Tiger-Cats.

Early life
Gilliam attended Aberdeen High School in Aberdeen, Maryland. He first enrolled at Cheyney University of Pennsylvania before transferring to Millersville University of Pennsylvania.

Professional career

San Diego Chargers
Gilliam was signed by the NFL's San Diego Chargers on April 24, 2001, after going undrafted in the 2001 NFL Draft. He was allocated on January 28, 2002, to NFL Europe, where he played for the Scottish Claymores. He was released by the Chargers on September 1 and signed to the Chargers' practice squad on September 2, 2002. Gilliam was signed to the active roster on November 14, 2002. He was released by the Chargers on November 19 and signed to the team's practice squad on November 20, 2002. He was released by the Chargers on August 26, 2003. Gilliam signed with the Chargers on September 26, 2003. He became an unrestricted free agent in March 2004. He was released by the Chargers on October 22, 2003, and signed to the Chargers' practice squad the same day. He was released by the Chargers on November 14 and signed to the team's practice squad on November 26, 2003. Gilliam was signed to the active roster on December 21, 2003.

Hamilton Tiger-Cats
Gilliam signed with the Hamilton Tiger-Cats of the CFL on August 17, 2004. He was released by the Tiger-Cats on May 28, 2006.

References

External links
Just Sports Stats

Living people
1977 births
American football wide receivers
Canadian football wide receivers
African-American players of American football
African-American players of Canadian football
Cheyney Wolves football players
Millersville Marauders football players
San Diego Chargers players
Scottish Claymores players
Hamilton Tiger-Cats players
Players of American football from Baltimore
People from Aberdeen, Maryland
21st-century African-American sportspeople
20th-century African-American sportspeople